is a Japanese coming-of-age ceremony which dates back to Japan's classical Nara Period (710–794 AD).[1] This ceremony marked the transition from child to adult status and the assumption of adult responsibilities. The age of participation varied throughout history and depended on factors such as sex, political climate, and social status. Most participants were aristocratic children between the ages of 10 and 20, and most descriptions of genpuku focus on the male ceremony rather than the female ceremony due to the exclusion of women from politically important court positions and warrior status. Important changes in clothing and hairstyle typically denoted this transition, for both men and women. Youth and children were often synonymous, and a period of adolescence was not often present throughout the periods in which traditional genpuku flourished. The etymology of the word, which is atypical, reflects the major points of genpuku ceremonial format; in this case  means "head" and  means "wearing".

General ceremonial format 
Genpuku was traditionally considered a major rite, an important ritual affecting life course in which a child exchanged his childhood status for an adult status, and continues from the Nara (710–794 AD) into the Tokugawa period (1603–1868). The population, and members of the population, participating in genpuku depended largely upon both which historical time period the ceremony took place in and the kind of government that was in place at the time. Specific ceremonial formats are built around specific constructions of class, rank, and time period.

Child roles as preparation for adult roles 
Since aristocratic children between the ages of 10 and 20 took part in genpuku in order to assume adult status and responsibilities, the role of the aristocratic child was to prepare for adult life. For both male and female children, studies in the Heian Period began between ages 3 and 4, usually under the supervision of a wet nurse and perhaps her husband. Children of these ages were taught about key court ceremonies, Buddhist doctrine, and proper ethics. At the age of seven they moved on to more formal learning, specifically studying the skills needed to navigate court life and to succeed in court positions. Skills included, but were by no means limited to, handwriting and calligraphy, and were mainly an education requirement for male children; however, the education of girls was important as well. The ultimate goal of children, whether they were male or female, was to successfully carry on their family's tradition and reputation. Proper education for girls tied to successful or advantageous marriage, or their future ability to maintain a wealthy patron within the court.

Nara and Heian Periods (710–1192) 

The earliest official record of genpuku in Japan dates back to the Nara period (710–794 AD), and the ceremony itself is based on an earlier Chinese custom in the Tang Dynasty. Beyond the Nara, the ceremony flourished throughout the aristocratic Heian Period (794–1185 AD), the last classical period in which Japan was governed by an aristocratic court. Children during Heian were not recognized as officially gendered before genpuku, and were said to have remained near the gods as "children of the kami". As children of the gods, those who had not undergone genpuku were often seen as youthful mediums and were some of the primary performers of ritual exorcisms. In addition, clothing and attire of childhood were ungendered and it was not uncommon for male children to wear makeup often as wakashū. In the period between early childhood and genpuku, boys were classified as wakashū.

During these periods, primarily male members of the aristocracy between the ages of seven and fifteen engaged in genpuku. The ceremony was generally a precursor to obtaining court cap and rank. Parents chose when to hold their children's genpuku based on a number of factors, including the arrival of a suitable opportunity, the child's readiness for court service, the presence of one or more influential court backers, and the parents' ability to finance the ceremony.

Once it was deemed an appropriate time for a child to undergo genpuku, a variety of preparations were made for the upcoming ceremony. The child had to acquire a "capping parent", usually a person of influence, who would help the child don the ritual clothing of adulthood, most significantly a ceremonial court hat (kanmuri). Both the capping parent and the biological parents made preparations for the ceremony, but the capping parent was more active in making arrangements.

The genpuku ceremony itself almost always took place in the evening on a predetermined "auspicious day," either at the residence of a Kakan (dignitary) or at the Shishinden (Kyoto Imperial Palace). When the capping ceremony was held for the son of a Counselor or Consultant, the capping parent was most often a Kakan and the ceremony took place at a Kakan's residence. When the ceremony was held for an Emperor or Crown prince, the current Emperor would sometimes cap the initiate within the Shishinden. The capping parent was joined by another important ceremonial participant, either the Nokan (if an Emperor was undergoing the ceremony) or a Rihatsu, who "loosened the childhood coiffure, cut the ends of the hair, bound the head with a fillet, and otherwise prepared the boy to receive the cap". After the capping, the child retreated to a private room to exchange his ungendered wide-sleeved childhood robes for adult male robes. The transition from child to adult was complete, and feasting followed closely thereafter. Genpuku and adult status were accompanied by marriage eligibility, gendering, a removal from the male "erotic gaze" within court, the abandon of makeup use for males, and the opportunity to obtain court rank.

Girls engaged in genpuku as well, although the particular ceremonial rituals were more commonly referred to as mogi. For women, as for men, the ceremony revolved around the presentation of adult clothing; however, women were presented with a pleated skirt, not a court cap.  Girls participating in mogi coming-of-age ceremonies traditionally blackened their teeth, shaved their eyebrows, and applied makeup. In addition, their long unbound hair was tied on top of their head in an adult hairstyle.

Age of the samurai (1185–1868) 

In 1185 AD the aristocratic court government of classical Japan was forced to coexist with a warrior-administration, ushering in the Age of the Samurai. Just as the sons of aristocracy underwent the ceremony of genpuku to signify their adulthood, so did the sons of warrior nobility. The central feature of genpuku throughout this time period was the placing of a samurai helmet, rather than court cap, by a high status warrior. Adult samurai received their swords and armor at this time. After going through genpuku, youths were expected to do adult labor, and samurai-class men acquired full warrior status and were expected to fight in open battle. In addition, youths gained the right to marry, and to officiate at shrine ceremonies. The ceremony acted to bind youth to the previously mentioned high status warrior. Often this practice was used to confirm and solidify the social status of samurai families. For example, a samurai family of lower status might, through the ceremony of genpuku, become tied to a higher status family. The lower status son would then act as a retainer to the higher status warrior to whom he was tied. After genpuku, warrior sons were accepted as full adults and welcomed to a career in the warrior-administration.

The average age of genpuku varied over time. For example, throughout the Tokugawa period (1603–1868), the age at which children underwent genpuku depended upon whether there was unrest. Full-fledged warriors were expected to take part in battle, so during the unsettled first years of the Tokugawa period, parents delayed genpuku until their sons were full-grown, at around 20 years old. However, as the country became more peaceful, a transition period resembling adolescence emerged. Young boys underwent genpuku and trained to be warriors under an older warrior, but did not engage in war. War acted as a sort of consummation following genpuku, solidifying societal acknowledgement of full adult warrior status. As the long peace continued, the appropriate age to transition from child to adult was lowered in response to dynastic pressures to marry and produce heirs. Boys could not marry until they came of age, so the "adolescent phase" vanished. By the 1700s the average coming of age of samurai-class boys was at 15 to 17, and in the early to mid-1800s it dropped to an average of 13 to 15.

Muromachi Period (1338–1573) 
During the Muromachi Period, a period set within the Age of the Samurai, genpuku gradually spread from the samurai class to include men and women of lower ranks. Within the less wealthy, genpuku was used as a way of acknowledging an entrance into occupational roles, often in the form of apprenticeship. Boys of farming families and the artisan class came of age at 15 to 17, an age that had more to do with their ability to do adult work and take on adult social responsibilities than with their readiness for marriage or war.[1] As a result of the new meanings tied to the ceremony and work, the once solid transitions between childhood and adulthood were lost within the artisan and merchant classes. Adulthood was put off in order that youth could acquire more or new skills related to their future occupations, resulting in the re-emergence of a period resembling adolescence.

Seijin shiki – a present-day equivalent 

The modern day equivalent to genpuku became popular in the face of post-war hardship and regrowth. After the second World War and the bombing of Hiroshima and Nagasaki, Japan faced considerable and widespread despondency. Young people are often seen as the hope of the future, and in an attempt to restore hope to Japan and its youth, the town of Warabi, just north of Tokyo, held a Youth Festival. The festival was successful and Coming-of-Age Day became an official holiday in 1948, "to realise the passage from youth to adulthood, and to celebrate and encourage young people embarking on their adult lives".

See also
 Coming of age
 Coming of Age Day
 Seijin shiki
 Guan Li, the Chinese coming-of age ceremony

Notes
 In premodern Japan, ages 15, 16, 17, etc. corresponded roughly with modern Japanese and Western ages 14, 15, 16, etc. The average age of genpuku was therefore 15 to 18 in premodern Japanese reckoning, and 14 to 17 in modern reckoning.

References

External links 
 The Tale of Genji  – Contains a description of genpuku during the aristocratic Heian period

Society of Japan
Rites of passage